Leptasterias muelleri, the northern starfish, is a species of starfish in the family Asteriidae. It is found in the Arctic Ocean and the northern Atlantic Ocean. It is a predator and scavenger and is unusual among starfish in that it broods its young.

Description
It has a small disc and five broad, tapering arms that are clearly demarcated from the disc. The aboral (upper) surface is rough, being covered with longitudinally arranged, knob-shaped spines. These are surrounded by small pedicellariae (claw-shaped structures) and interspersed by papulae (respiratory projections). The oral (under) surface of the arms have four longitudinal rows of tube feet with suckers. The colour of this starfish may be pale purple, pink or green, with pale coloured tips to the arms. Green individuals have a symbiotic green alga living in the tissues and are normally found living in shallow water.

Distribution and habitat
Leptasterias muelleri has a wide distribution in the Arctic Ocean and northern Atlantic Ocean. Its range extends from the Gulf of Maine, Greenland and Iceland to the Barents Sea, Scandinavia, the North Sea and the British Isles. It occurs on the lower shore, where it hides under stones, and to depths of at least .

References

Leptasterias
Animals described in 1846
Taxa named by Michael Sars